Kutlug I Bilge Boyla Khagan, also known by his throne name Qutlugh Bilge Kül Qaghan (骨咄禄毗伽阙可汗, Gǔduōlù Píjiā Quē Kèhán), and in Chinese sources the personal name of Yaoluoge Yibiaobi (藥羅葛逸标苾) was the Khagan of Uyghur Khaganate, the successor state of the Second Turkic Khaganate, from 744 to 747 AD.

Service in Second Turkic Khaganate 
His title was Külüg Boyla (Guli Peiluo - 骨力裴罗) during Second Turkic Khaganate. He was a son of Yaoluoge Hushu (trad. 藥羅葛護輸; simp. 药罗葛护输). His father was the chieftain of Yaglakar clan and made numerous raids into Tang China. At one point he was able to ambush Jiedushi Wang Junchuo (王君㚟) killing him and wounding Niu Xianke in 727. He succeeded his father at some point after 727.

After Bilge Qaghan died, a factional struggle  arose within the ruling Ashina clan. An alliance of Basmyls, Uyghurs and Karluks overthrew Göktürks and in the spring of 745 killed the last Ozmish Qaghan. At first, the Basmyl chief was elected a Kaghan titled Eletmish Kaghan (742—744), but he was soon overthrown by the allies, who elected Kutlug Boyla as Kutlug Bilge Kaghan.

Reign 
After coming to power in 744, Kutlug Bilge Khagan moved his court to Khar Balgas (Ordu-Baliq) in the Orkhon valley. In foreign policy, Kutlug Bilge Kaghan maintained alliance with the Tang China. He was created Prince of Fengyi (奉义王) and Huairen Khagan (怀仁可汗).

In 745 Uighurs defeated last Turkic Khagan Baimei Khagan (744 - 745), and Kutlug Bilge Kaghan ordered to send his head to Chang'an, after which the Tang Emperor generously thanked him with entitling him "Supernumerary General-in-chief of Left Courageous Guard" (左骁卫员外大将军). For the next two years, the Uighur power continuously expanded, although its control did not reach the size of the Turkic Khaganate.

He died in 747 and left his son Tay Bilge Tutuq as heir to throne, however his other son Bayanchur Khan was killed him and usurped the throne. He had another son - Tun Bagha Tarkhan who later rose to be a khagan as well.

Reorganized tribes 
At first he proclaimed himself as Tokuz Oghuz khagan. Nine tribes included Dokuz Oghuz (nine Oghuz tribes), which were the Khaganal clan/sub-tribe Yaglakar and eight Uighur clans/sub-tribes known in Chinese rendering:

 Huduoge 胡咄葛 
 Guluowu 啒罗勿 
 Mogexiqi 貊歌息讫 
 A-Wudi 阿勿嘀 
 Gesa 葛萨 
 Huwasu 斛嗢素 
 Yaowuge 藥勿葛
 Xiyawu 奚牙勿

According to Edwin Pulleybank six Tiele tribes in the confederation - Bugu (僕固), Hun (渾), Bayegu (拔野古), Tongluo (同羅), Sijie (思結) and Qibi (契苾) had an equal status with the Uighurs (迴紇); the reduced Basmyls numbered eight sub-tribes, and Karluks had three sub-tribes, thus the collective appellation Üç-Karluk (Three Karluks). Later the Abusi (阿布思) and Gulunwugu(si) (骨崙屋骨[思]) were also added (Tang Huiyao manuscript has 骨崙屋骨恐 Guluwugukong, yet Ulrich Theobald (2012) amends 恐 (kong) to 思 (si) & proposes that 屋骨思 transcribed Oğuz). Basmyls and Karluks were defeated by the Jiu Xing and forcibly incorporated, had a lower status, and were staged as vanguard of the Uighur army, thus bringing the total number of tribes to eleven.

According to Haneda (1957), Toquz Oğuz were the Yaglakar-led group of nine clans included in the Uighur tribe. In contrast, Golden (1992) proposed that Toquz Oğuz consisted of Uygur-led group comprising nine tribes: Bugu, Hun, Bayegu, Tongluo, Sijie, Qibi, A-Busi, Gulunwugusi and the Uyghur proper, which comprised the nine clans of Yaglakar, Huduoge, Guluowu, Mogexiqi, AWudi, Gesa, Huwasu, Yaowuge, and Xiyawu. The Shine Usu inscription mentioned that the Yaqlakar ruled over the On-Uyğur (Ten[-Tribes] Uyghur) and Toquz Oghuz (Nine[-Tribe] Oghuz). Meanwhile, noticing that Tang Huiyao called the nine groups, led by Yaglakar, "surname-tribes" (姓部 xìngbù) while Old Book of Tang and the New Book of Tang called the other nine groups, led by Uyghurs, "tribes" (部落 bùluò), Japanese scholars Hashimoto, Katayama, and Senga propose that the Tang Huiyao's list contained the names of the Toquz Oghuz tribes proper, while each name in the two lists in the Books of Tang recorded each surname of each of nine subtribal chiefs.

References

Yaglakar clan
747 deaths
8th-century Turkic people
8th-century monarchs in Asia
Year of birth unknown
Founding monarchs
Tengrist monarchs